Mick Leech (born 6 August 1948 in Dublin) was an Irish professional football player who made his name with Shamrock Rovers in the 1960s.

He was signed by Paddy Ambrose and Liam Tuohy for Rovers in September 1966 from junior side Ormeau. He spent 6 weeks in the reserves before he made his first team debut against Dundalk at Milltown on New Year's Day 1967. Rovers drew 1–1 and Mick was substituted by Billy Dixon in the second half.

Leech scored his first goal for the Hoops on 4 January 1967. He played his first FAI Cup tie for Rovers in the semi-final against Dundalk and scored Rovers' goal as they drew 1–1. The Hoops made no mistake in the replay as Mick scored twice in a 3–0 win. He went to score the second equaliser in the final against St Pat's and Mick Leech had his first Cup medal while still a teenager.

That summer Rovers toured the United States as Boston Rovers and at the tours end he, along with Paddy Mulligan were offered terms by the locals .

In 1968 Leech again stamped his mark on the Cup, scoring twice both in the semi-final and the final. It was during the following season, 1968/69, that Mick really stormed on the scene as he notched up an incredible total of 55 goals during the season. These included 2 in the Cup Final replay against Cork Celtic. He was top league goal scorer that season with 19 goals.

Tuohy managed the Irish team that took part in the mini World Cup in Brazil in 1972 and two of the best players he had were Mick Leech and Mick Martin.

Mick became disheartened with the game and left Rovers, in a swap with Tommy McConville in December 1973 for Waterford .

In December 1975 Leech played in an exhibition game at Croke Park .

He returned to Milltown in September 1976 when Seán Thomas signed him  and the following month, he scored his 250th goal in senior football when his 30-yard shot in the last minute beat Sligo in Rovers' only win to date in the League Cup. When Johnny Giles took over the following season Leech didn't figure in his plans and he moved to Bohemians.

He later played for Drogheda United, Dundalk F.C. and St Patrick's Athletic. He was assistant manager at Dundalk in the 1981/82 season.

One of the greatest ever strikers in the League of Ireland Mick Leech made 6 appearances in European competition for the Hoops. He also earned 4 Inter-League caps scoring once and scored 84 league goals and 18 goals in the FAI Cup.

He also played 8 times for the Republic of Ireland national football team, scoring twice. His international debut came on 4 May 1969 in a 2–1 defeat to Czechoslovakia in a World Cup qualifier in Dalymount Park.

Mick later managed Athlone Town in the 1990/91 season.

His son Mark Leech and brother Bobby also played for Rovers.

At the end of the 2012 League of Ireland season Leech is fifteenth in the all-time League of Ireland goalscoring list with 132 league goals

Career statistics

International goals

Sources 
 The Hoops by Paul Doolan and Robert Goggins

References

1948 births
Living people
Shamrock Rovers F.C. players
Waterford F.C. players
Republic of Ireland international footballers
Republic of Ireland association footballers
Association footballers from Dublin (city)
Bohemian F.C. players
Drogheda United F.C. players
Dundalk F.C. players
St Patrick's Athletic F.C. players
United Soccer Association players
Boston Rovers players
League of Ireland players
Athlone Town A.F.C. managers
League of Ireland managers
League of Ireland XI players
Association football forwards
Republic of Ireland football managers